Wuri is a railway in Wuri District, Taichung, Taiwan. It is served by the Taiwan Railways Administration Taichung line. Although it has the same name as Wuri metro station, the railway and metro stations are not connected, and are located roughly 300 meters apart.

Overview 
One island platform
Station layout

Rail service
As a minor station, Wuri Station is primarily serviced by Local Trains (區間車). A few times per day a Chu-Kuang Express (莒光號) or a Tzu-Chiang Limited Express (自強號) stops at the station.

See also
 List of railway stations in Taiwan

References 

1905 establishments in Taiwan
Railway stations opened in 1905
Railway stations in Taichung
Railway stations served by Taiwan Railways Administration